Spatial neural networks (SNNs) constitute a supercategory of tailored neural networks (NNs) for representing and predicting geographic phenomena. They generally improve both the statistical accuracy and reliability of the a-spatial/classic NNs whenever they handle  geo-spatial datasets, and also of the other spatial (statistical) models (e.g. spatial regression models) whenever the geo-spatial datasets' variables depict non-linear relations. Examples of SNNs are the OSFA spatial neural networks, SVANNs and GWNNs.

History
Openshaw (1993) and Hewitson et al. (1994) started investigating the applications of the a-spatial/classic NNs to geographic phenomena. They observed that a-spatial/classic NNs outperform the other extensively applied a-spatial/classic statistical models (e.g. regression models, clustering algorithms, maximum likelihood classifications) in geography, especially when there exist non-linear relations between the geo-spatial datasets' variables. Thereafter, Openshaw (1998) also compared these a-spatial/classic NNs with other modern and original a-spatial statistical models at that time (i.e. fuzzy logic models, genetic algorithm models); he concluded that the a-spatial/classic NNs are statistically competitive. Thereafter scientists developed several categories of SNNs – see below.

Spatial models
Spatial statistical models (aka geographically weighted models, or merely spatial models) like the geographically weighted regressions, SNNs, etc., are spatially tailored (a-spatial/classic) statistical models, so to learn and model the deterministic components of the spatial variability (i.e. spatial dependence/autocorrelation, spatial heterogeneity, spatial association/cross-correlation) from the geo-locations of the geo-spatial datasets’ (statistical) individuals/units.

Categories
There exist several categories of methods/approaches for designing and applying SNNs.
One-Size-Fits-all (OSFA) spatial neural networks, use the OSFA method/approach for globally computing the spatial weights and designing a spatial structure from the originally a-spatial/classic neural networks.
Spatial Variability Aware Neural Networks (SVANNs) use an enhanced OSFA method/approach that locally recomputes the spatial weights and redesigns the spatial structure of the originally a-spatial/classic NNs, at each geo-location of the (statistical) individuals/units' attributes' values. They generally outperform the OSFA spatial neural networks, but they do not consistently handle the spatial heterogeneity at multiple scales.
Geographically Weighted Neural Networks (GWNNs) are similar to the SVANNs but they use the so-called Geographically Weighted Model (GWM) method/approach by Lu et al. (2023), so to locally recompute the spatial weights and redesign the spatial structure of the originally a-spatial/classic neural networks. Like the SVANNs, they do not consistently handle spatial heterogeneity at multiple scales.

Applications

There exist case-study applications of SNNs in: 
agriculture for classifying the vegetation;
real estate for appraising the premises.

See also

 Statistics
 Neural networks' supercategories 
 Statistical software
 Quantitative geography
 Spatial analysis
 GIS software

References

  Neural network architectures Spatial analysis